A quilombo (from the Kimbundu word) is a Brazilian hinterland settlement founded by people of African origin, and others sometimes called Carabali. Most of the inhabitants of quilombos, called quilombolas, were maroons, a term for escaped slaves.

Documentation about refugee slave communities typically uses the term mocambo for settlements, which is an Ambundu word meaning "war camp". A mocambo is typically much smaller than a quilombo. The term quilombo was not used until the 1670s, and then primarily in the more southerly parts of Brazil.

In the Spanish-speaking countries of Latin America, such villages or camps were called . They spoke various Spanish-African-based creole languages such as Palenquero.

Quilombos are classified as one of the three basic forms of active resistance by enslaved Africans. They also regularly attempted to seize power and conducted armed insurrections at plantations to gain amelioration of conditions. Typically, quilombos were a "pre-19th century phenomenon". In the first half of the 19th-century in Brazil, slaves typically took armed action as part of their resistance. The colony was undergoing both political transition, as it fought for independence from Portugal, and new tensions associated with an increased slave trade, which brought in many more native-born Africans, who resisted slavery.

Slavery in Brazil 

Legal slavery was present in Brazil for approximately three centuries, with the earliest known landing of enslaved Africans taking place 52 years after the Portuguese were the first Europeans to set foot in Brazil in 1500. The demand for enslaved Africans continued to increase through the 18th century, even as the Brazilian sugar economy ceased to dominate the world economy. In its place, commodity crops such as tobacco increased in prominence.

During the sugar boom period (1570–1670), the sugar plantations in Brazil presented hellish conditions, even including the personal brutality of some slave owners. There was high physical exertion on workers, especially during harvest season. In addition, enslaved people were held to nearly-impossible daily production quotas while having to contend with lack of rest and food. Economically in sugar plantations, it was cheaper for owners of enslaved Africans to work them to death and get new replacement enslaved people. Conditions were so bad that even the Crown intervened on at least two occasions, forcing plantation owners to give their slaves sufficient food.

History 
See Atlantic slave trade for a comprehensive presentation of slavery in Brazil.

Settlements were formed by enslaved Africans who escaped from plantations. Some slave owners, such as Friedrich von Weech, regarded the first escape attempt as a part of "breaking in" process for new slaves. The first escape attempt would be punished severely as a deterrent for future escapes. Slaves who tried to escape a second time would be sent to slave prison, and those who tried a third time would be sold. In general, slaves who were caught running away were also required to wear an iron collar around their necks at all times, in addition to the punishment they received.

Not all slaves who ran away formed settlements in Brazil. Escape from a life of slavery was a matter of opportunity. Settlements were formed in areas with dense populations of slaves, like Pernambuco, where the biggest collection of mocambos formed the quilombo that became Palmares. While many quilombos were formed in rural areas such as Palmares, some were formed inside of cities, such as the :pt:Quilombo do Leblon inside of Rio de Janeiro. Some, among them Mahommah G. Baquaqua, escaped to New York because his multiple attempts at escape and suicide led to him being sold to a ship's captain.

It is widely believed that the term quilombo establishes a link between settlements and the culture of West Central Africa from where the majority of slaves were forcibly brought to Brazil. During the era of slave trafficking, natives in central Angola, called Imbangala, had created an institution called a kilombo that united various tribes of diverse lineage into a community designed for military resistance.

Many quilombos were near Portuguese plantations and settlements. To keep their freedom, they were active both in defending against capitães do mato and being commissioned to recapture other runaway slaves. At the same time, they facilitated the escape of even more enslaved persons. For this reason, they were targets of the Dutch, then Portuguese colonial authorities and, later, of the Brazilian state and slave owners.

Despite the atmosphere of cooperation between some quilombos and the surrounding Portuguese settlements, they were almost always eventually destroyed. Seven of 10 major quilombos in colonial Brazil were terminated within two years of formation. Some mocambos that were farther from Portuguese settlements and the later Brazilian cities were tolerated and still exist as towns today, with their dwellers speaking Portuguese Creole languages.

Quilombos 
Some quilombo communities are summarized in this section.

Of the 10 major quilombos in colonial Brazil, seven were destroyed within two years of being formed. Four fell in the state of Bahia in 1632, 1636, 1646 and 1796. The other three met the same fate in Rio in 1650, Parahyba in 1731, and Piumhy in 1758.

One quilombo, in Minas Gerais, lasted from 1712-1719. Another, the "Carlota" of Mato Grosso, was wiped out after existing for 25 years, from 1770-1795.

There were also a number of smaller quilombos or mocambos. The first reported quilombo was in 1575 in Bahia. Another quilombo in Bahia was reported at the start of the seventeenth century. Between 1737-87, a small quilombo thrived in the vicinity of Sao Paulo.

There were also reports of mocambos in 1591 in Jaguaripe, in 1629 in Rio Vermelho, in 1636 in Itapicuru, in 1640 in Rio Real, in 1663 in Cairu, in 1723 in Camamu,  in 1741 in Santo Amaro, in 1763 in Itapao, and in 1797 in Cachoeira. All of these mocambos were in the Bahia region.

The Buraco de Tatu mocambo thrived for 20 years between 1743 and 1763. It was located between Salvador and Itapoa, until it was eventually destroyed by a force led by Joaquim da Costa Cardozo.

The region of Campo Grande and São Francisco was often populated with quilombos. In 1741, Jean Ferreira organised an expedition against a quilombo, but many runaways escaped capture. In 1746, a subsequent expedition captured 120 members of the quilombo. In 1752, an expedition led by Pere Marcos was attacked by quilimbo fighters, resulting in significant loss of life.

Quilombos continued to form in the nineteenth century. In 1810, a quilombo was discovered at Linhares in the state of Sao Paulo. A decade later, another was found in Minas. In 1828, another quilombo was discovered at Cahuca, near Recife, and a year later an expedition was mounted against yet another at Corcovado, near Rio. In 1855, the Maravilha quilombo in Amazonia was destroyed.

Palmares 
The most famous quilombo was Palmares, an independent, self-sustaining community near Recife, established in about 1600. Palmares was massive and consisted of several settlements with a combined population of over 30,000 citizens, mostly blacks. It was to survive almost an entire century. 

Part of the reason for the massive size of the quilombo at Palmares was because of its location in Brazil, at the median point between the Atlantic Ocean and Guinea, an important area of the African slave trade. Quilombo dos Palmares was a self-sustaining community of escaped slaves from the Portuguese settlements in Brazil, "a region perhaps the size of Portugal in the hinterland of Bahia".

In 1612, the Portuguese tried in vain to take Palmares in an expedition that proved to be very costly.

In 1640, a Dutch scouting mission found that the self-freed community of Palmares was spread over two settlements, with about 6,000 living in one location, and another 5,000 in another. Dutch expeditions against Palmares in the 1640s were similarly unsuccessful.

At its height, Palmares had a population of over 30,000. In the 1670s, when the Portuguese tried to take control of half of Palmares, it was estimated that the palmarista population of that half was between 15,000-20,000.

Palmares thrived in the years of peace that followed the 1640s.

Between 1672-1694, Palmares withstood on average one Portuguese expedition nearly every year.

Ganga Zumba and Zumbi are the two best-known warrior-leaders of Palmares which, after a history of conflict with first Dutch and then Portuguese colonial authorities, finally fell to a Portuguese artillery assault in 1694. 

Forced to defend against repeated attacks by Portuguese colonists, the warriors of Palmares were experts in capoeira, a dance and martial art form. Portuguese soldiers sometimes stated it took more than one dragoon to capture a quilombo warrior since they would defend themselves with a strangely moving fighting technique (capoeira). The governor from that province declared that "it is harder to defeat a quilombo than the Dutch invaders".

In Brazil, both men are now honored as heroes and symbols of black pride, freedom, and democracy. As his birthday is unknown, Zumbi's execution date, November 20, is observed as Dia da Consciência Negra or "Black Awareness Day" in the states of Rio de Janeiro and São Paulo, and his image has appeared on postage stamps, banknotes, and coins.

Mola 
The Mola quilombo consisted of approximately 300 formerly enslaved people and had a high degree of political, social and military organization.  Felipa Maria Aranha was the first leader of the community. The group was also led by Maria Luiza Piriá. It was organised as a republic, with democratic voting in place. Over the course of the Mola quilombo's life, it expanded to include four other similar settlements in the region and was known as the Confederação do Itapocu.  In 1895 there were still traces of the settlement to be seen; as of 2020, they had disappeared.

Curiaú 
In 1992, the Rio Curiaú Environmental Protection Area was established for the inhabitants of Curiaú de Dentro, Curiaú de Fora, Casa Grande, Curralinho and Mocambo. The area is located near the capital Macapá and measures . As of 1999, the protected area is home to about 1,500 people.

Cunani 
Even though Cunani is better known as the capital of the unrecognised Republic of Independent Guiana, it has been designated a Quilombo settlement, and therefore, has been given its own territory similar to the indigenous territories.

Film 

A 1984 film entitled Quilombo depicts the rise and fall of Palmares. Directed by Carlos Diegues, Quilombo is a historical epic that chronicles the lives of Ganga Zumba and Zumbi.

Constitution of Brazil 

Article 68 of the 1988 Constitution of Brazil granted the remaining quilombos the collective ownership of the lands they had occupied since colonial times. As of 2016, 294 villages have applied to be recognized as quilombos, because they were founded by escaped slaves and are mainly inhabited by their descendents. The certification process thus far has been slow, and 152 villages have been recognized as quilombos.

In Spanish 

In South American Spanish of the Southern Cone the word quilombo has come to mean brothel; in Argentina, Bolivia, Honduras, Paraguay and Uruguay, a mess, noise or disorder; in Venezuela, a remote or out-of-the-way place.

See also 
 Garifuna people
 San Basilio de Palenque
 Slave revolts in Brazil
 Slave states and free states
 Suscia
 Zambo

References

Further reading 
 Glenn Alan Cheney, Quilombo dos Palmares: Brazil's Lost Nation of Fugitive Slaves, Hanover, CT:New London Librarium, 2014.

External links 

 The Quilombo of Palmares: A New Overview of a Maroon State in Seventeenth-Century Brazil (scholarly article)
 Fugitive Slaves and Free Society: The Case of Brazil (scholarly article)
 Buried Alive: Imagining Africa in the Brazilian Northeast (scholarly article)
 Oppression & Rebellion: The Quilombo at Palmares (scholarly article)
 Articles and sources for quilombos in Brazil
 Maroon community in Colombia
Voice of the Leopard: African Secret Societies and Cuba
Discovering Rio's Little Africa

Ethnic groups in Brazil
Maroons (people)
 
Slavery in Brazil
Race in Brazil